The 1962 election to the Uttar Pradesh Legislative Assembly in India resulted in the re-election of Chandra Bhanu Gupta of the Indian National Congress as Chief Minister of Uttar Pradesh. Congress retained a commanding majority despite losing some seats to the Bharatiya Jana Sangh.

Elected members

References 

 Uttar Pradesh 1962, Election Commission of India.

State Assembly elections in Uttar Pradesh
Uttar